Quite Universal Circuit Simulator (Qucs) is a free-software electronics circuit simulator software application released under GPL. It offers the ability to set up a circuit with a graphical user interface and simulate the large-signal, small-signal and noise behaviour of the circuit. Pure digital simulations are also supported using VHDL and/or Verilog.

Qucs supports a growing list of analog and digital components as well as SPICE sub-circuits.  It is intended to be much simpler to use and handle than other circuit simulators like gEDA or PSPICE.

Analysis types 
Analysis types include S-parameter (including noise), AC (including noise), DC, Transient Analysis, Harmonic Balance (not yet finished), Digital simulation (VHDL and Verilog-HDL) and Parameter sweeps.

Features at a glance 
Qucs has a graphical interface for schematic capture. Simulation data can be represented in various types of diagrams, including Smith-Chart, Cartesian, Tabular, Polar, Smith-Polar combination, 3D-Cartesian, Locus Curve, Timing Diagram and Truth Table.

The documentation offers many useful tutorials (WorkBook), reports (ReportBook) and a technical description of the simulator.

Other features include the transmission line calculator, Filter synthesis, Smith-Chart tool for power and noise matching, Attenuator design synthesis, Device model and subcircuit library manager, Optimizer for analog designs, the Verilog-A interface, Support for multiple languages (GUI and internal help system), Subcircuit (including parameters) hierarchy, Powerful data post-processing possible using equations and symbolically defined nonlinear and linear devices.

Tool suite 
Qucs consists of several standalone programs interacting with each other through a GUI.

The GUI is used to create schematics, setup simulations, display simulation results, writing VHDL code, etc.

The analog simulator, gnucsator, is a command line program which is run by the GUI in order to simulate the schematic which you previously setup. It reads a netlist file augmented with commands, performs simulations, and finally produces a dataset file. It can also report errors.

The GUI includes a text editor which can display netlists and simulation logging information. It is handy to edit files related to certain components (e.g. SPICE netlists, or Touchstone files).

A filter synthesis application can help design various types of filters.

The transmission line calculator can be used to design and analyze different types of transmission lines (e.g. microstrips, coaxial cables).

A component library manager gives access to models for real life devices (e.g. transistors, diodes, bridges, opamps). These are usually implemented as macros. The library can be extended by the user.

The attenuator synthesis application can be used to design various types of passive attenuators.

The command line conversion program tool is used by the GUI to import and export datasets, netlists and schematics from and to other CAD/EDA software. The supported file formats as well as usage information can be found on the manpage of qucsconv.

Additionally, the GUI can steer other EDA tools. Analog and mixed simulations can be performed by simulators that read the qucsator netlist format. For purely digital simulations (via VHDL) the program FreeHDL  or Icarus-Verilog can be used. For circuit optimization (minimization of a cost function), ASCO  may be invoked.

Components 
The following categories of components are provided:
 Lumped components (R, L, C, amplifier, phase shifter, etc.)
 Sources
 Probes
 Transmission lines
 Nonlinear components (diodes, transistors, etc.)
 Digital components
 File containers (S-parameter datasets, SPICE netlists)
 Paintings
There is also a Component library that includes various standard components available in the market (bridges, diodes, varistors, LEDs, JFETs, MOSFETS, and so on).

Transistor models 
Qucs supports transistor models, some need to be added by hand. Some have been tested, these include 
 FBH-HBT 
 HICUM L0 v1.12 
 HICUM L0 v1.2
 HICUM L2 v2.1  
 HICUM L2 v2.22 
 HICUM L2 v2.23 
 MESFET (Curtice, Statz, TOM-1 and TOM-2) 
 SGP (SPICE Gummel-Poon)  
 MOSFET  
 JFET 
 EPFL-EKV MOSFET v2.6.

See also

 Comparison of EDA Software
 List of free electronics circuit simulators

References

External links
 
 FreeHDL home page
 Icarus Verilog home page
 Win32 Binaries for Qucs and freehdl
 QucsStudio

Free electronic design automation software
Free software programmed in C++
Electronic design automation software for Linux
Electronic circuit simulators
Engineering software that uses Qt